Stigmatodon amadoi is a species of flowering plant in the family Bromeliaceae. It is endemic to Brazil.

References

amadoi
Flora of Brazil